AyosDito.ph was an online classified-ads website for Filipinos to buy and sell online, regardless of their location in the Philippines. It was owned and operated by 701Search Pte. Ltd., which is a joint venture between media giants Singapore Press Holdings and Schibsted. Launched in March 2009, AyosDito offered free posting of ads for items such as properties, cars, electronics, food, and even jobs. The phrase "Ayos Dito" is Tagalog for "Ok here". By 2013, it became the second largest online classified ads website in the Philippines.

In 2015 AyosDito formed a merger with OLX Philippines, itself acquiring former classifieds site Sulit in December 2013. Classifieds from the old site were not automatically merged with OLX, with users being sent emails asking if they want to migrate their listings to the new platform.

References

External links 
 

Philippine companies established in 2009
Singapore Press Holdings
Online marketplaces of the Philippines
Online advertising services and affiliate networks
Companies based in Makati
Internet properties established in 2009
Internet properties disestablished in 2015
2015 disestablishments in the Philippines

es:Ayos Dito